Do I Hear a Waltz? is a studio album by Jo Stafford and Paul Weston on Dot Records released in 1966.

Track listing
 "Do I Hear a Waltz?"
 "Down in the Valley"
 "Three-Four, Open the Door"
 "The King of Paris"
 "Beautiful Ohio"
 "Together"
 "True Love"
 "I See Your Face Before Me"
 "Fascination"
 "When I'm Not Near the Boy I Love"
 "Far Away Places"
 "Afterthoughts"

References

1966 albums
Jo Stafford albums
Dot Records albums
Albums conducted by Paul Weston